Flamatt railway station is a railway station in the municipality of Wünnewil-Flamatt, in the Swiss canton of Fribourg. It sits at the junction of the standard gauge Flamatt–Laupen line of the Sensetalbahn and the Lausanne–Bern line of Swiss Federal Railways.

Services 
 the following services stop at Flamatt:

 Bern S-Bahn:

References

External links 
 
 

Railway stations in the canton of Fribourg
Swiss Federal Railways stations